First class (or 1st class, Firstclass) generally implies a high level of service, importance or quality. Specific uses of the term include:

Books and Comics
 First Class, a comic strip in The Dandy (1983-1998)
 X-Men: First Class (comics)

Film and TV
 X-Men: First Class, a 2011 film
 First Class (game show), a UK game show
 First Class (TV series), a Singaporean comedy

Music

Artists 
 The First Class, a British pop band formed in 1974

Albums 
 1st Class (album), by Large Professor, 2002
First Class, by Billy Paul , 1979
First Class, by Mickey Gilley, 1977
First Class, by Claude Bolling, 1991

Songs 
"First Class" (song), by Jack Harlow, 2022
"First Class", by Henry Rollins from Big Ugly Mouth, 1987
"First Class", by Lil Baby from Harder Than Ever, 2018
"First Class", from the Hindi film Kalank, 2019
"First Class", by Khruangbin from Mordechai, 2020

Computing
 First-class type, a concept in programming
 First class (computing), a concept in data modeling
 First-class function
 First-class object, a concept in programming
 FirstClass, e-mail and online conferencing system

Leisure
 First Class rank, in Baden-Powell's Scout training scheme
 First Class Scout (Boy Scouts of America), rank in Boy Scouts

Sports
 First-class cricket
 First Class Diver – the highest grade of diver in the original (and now obsolete) classification system of the British Sub Aqua Club

Travel
 First class travel
 First class (aviation)
 FirstClass (airline), was a Finnish airline

Other uses
 First class constraint
 First Class mail
 First class honours degree,  see British undergraduate degree classification
 First class city, an income classification for cities in the Philippines